Pipo is a masculine given name. Notable people with the name include:

 Pipo (actor) (1933-1998), Mexican actor
 Pipo Nguyen-duy (born 1962), Vietnamese photographer
 Pipo of Ozora (1369–1426), Italian soldier
 Pipo (footballer, born 1992), Portuguese football forward
 Ale Pipo (born 1994), Spanish football attacking midfielder
 Pipo (footballer, born 1997), Spanish football midfielder
 Edmundo "Pipo" Rada (died 2019), Venezuelan politician
 Pipo de Clown, a Dutch television character

Masculine given names